William Lankham (4 December 1861 – 2 December 1886) was a New Zealand cricketer who played five first-class matches for Auckland before his death at the age of 24.

Life and career
A tall, strongly-built right-arm opening bowler, Lankham had an outstanding season for the Auckland United club in 1880–81, taking 84 wickets at an average of 3.32, helping Auckland United to an undefeated season. He played for the Auckland XXII against the touring English team in 1881–82, taking 3 for 69 off 87 four-ball overs. The English captain, Alfred Shaw, regarded Lankham as the best bowler the tourists faced in New Zealand.

He played his first first-class match in December 1882 for Auckland against Canterbury in Christchurch. He took 7 for 39 in Canterbury's first innings; on the second day, which was also his 21st birthday, he made the second-top score in Auckland's first innings with 27, batting at number ten; then he took 4 for 60. Canterbury nevertheless won by 27 runs. Auckland then travelled to Wellington, where Lankham took 3 for 28 and 4 for 41 in an Auckland victory. The team then crossed Cook Strait again to play Nelson. In a match in which 40 wickets fell for 370 runs, Lankham took 6 for 18 and 4 for 39, and Auckland won by four runs after the Nelson last-wicket pair had put on 50, the highest partnership of the match.

Three months later Taranaki travelled to Auckland to play their initial first-class match, but Lankham was too much for them, bowling unchanged to take 13 for 35 (7 for 13 and 6 for 22) and dismiss Taranaki for 63 and 55 to give Auckland an innings victory. Lankham finished the season as the leading wicket-taker in New Zealand with 41 wickets at an average of 6.34.

In 1883-84 Auckland played only one first-class match, against Canterbury in Auckland. Lankham bowled for most of the first innings and unchanged in the second to take 6 for 60 and 6 for 54, and Auckland won by four wickets. He never played again, and died from tuberculosis two days before his 25th birthday.

See also
 List of Auckland representative cricketers

References

External links
Cricinfo player profile
Cricket Archive profile

1861 births
1886 deaths
New Zealand cricketers
Auckland cricketers
Cricketers from Auckland
19th-century deaths from tuberculosis
Tuberculosis deaths in New Zealand